"One" is a song by American singer-songwriter Harry Nilsson from his 1968 album Aerial Ballet. It is known for its opening line "One is the loneliest number that you'll ever do".  Nilsson wrote the song after calling someone and getting a busy signal. He stayed on the line listening to the "beep, beep, beep, beep..." tone, writing the song. The busy signal became the opening notes.

A better-known cover version, recorded by Three Dog Night, reached number five on the U.S. Billboard Hot 100 in 1969 and number four in Canada. In 1969, the song was also recorded by Australian pop singer Johnny Farnham, reaching number four  on the Go-Set National Top 40 Chart.

Three Dog Night version

Three Dog Night released One as the second single from their eponymous first album. It became their first of seven gold records over the next five years.

The original issue of the single version fades out about ten seconds before the final notes heard on the album version.  Upon reissues by ABC Records and its successor labels, the label reverted to the album version which is heard on radio today.

The song reached number five on the U.S. Billboard Hot 100 and spent three weeks at number two on the Cash Box Top 100.  It also reached number four in Canada.

Chart performance

Weekly charts

Year-end charts

Certifications

Other versions
Many cover versions have been recorded. Among the most notable are:
 John Farnham released "One" as a double-sided single with "Mr. Whippy" in 1969, reaching number four in Australia.
 A cover by Aimee Mann is used in the 1999 film Magnolia. The song is the opening track for the movie's soundtrack album, and also appears on Mann's subsequent album Bachelor No. 2 or, the Last Remains of the Dodo.

References

External links
 [ Review of "One"] on allmusic.com

1968 songs
1968 singles
1969 singles
1995 singles
Songs written by Harry Nilsson
Harry Nilsson songs
Three Dog Night songs
Filter (band) songs
Song recordings produced by Rick Jarrard
RCA Records singles
Dunhill Records singles
Reprise Records singles
Songs about loneliness
Chamber pop songs